Washington (originally, Indiana Camp) is a census-designated place located in Nevada County, California. Washington is located on the banks of the South Yuba River and has a population of approximately two hundred people. There is a hotel/bar and restaurant, grocery store, a one-room schoolhouse that has educated students continuously for one hundred years, and two trailer park campgrounds. The population was 185 at the 2010 census. According to the 2020 census, the population was 137 with a median age of 61.7.

The population fluctuates seasonally and the town businesses rely on the tourist trade as the population increases in the summer. It was settled during the California Gold Rush in 1849 and produced a large amount of placer gold. Hard rock mines were established soon afterword and were very productive. Washington is the only settlement in the vicinity to have survived to this day. There remains today much evidence of placer gold mining, hydraulic mining, and hard-rock mining. During the mining period, many Chinese lived there.

Washington's biggest businesses are its two campsites, Little Town Campground (formerly Gene's Pine Aire Campground) and the River Rest, which has been in business since the 1960s through different owners. Filmmaker Sara Ross-Samko is making a feature-length documentary portrait of the town.

The ZIP Code is 95986. The community is inside area code 530.

History
The place was founded in 1849 by miners from Indiana and was originally named Indiana Camp. It was renamed Washington in 1850.

The Washington South Yuba post office operated here from 1852 to 1854. The Washington post office opened in 1862.

Geography

Demographics
The 2010 United States Census reported that Washington had a population of 185. The racial makeup of Washington was 166 (89.7%) White, 1 (0.5%) African American, 4 (2.2%) Native American, 0 (0.0%) Asian, 0 (0.0%) Pacific Islander, 4 (2.2%) from other races, and 10 (5.4%) from two or more races. Hispanic or Latino of any race were 11 persons (5.9%).

The Census reported that 169 people (91.4% of the population) lived in households, 16 (8.6%) lived in non-institutionalized group quarters, and 0 (0%) were institutionalized.

There were 90 households, out of which 11 (12.2%) had children under the age of 18 living in them, 21 (23.3%) were opposite-sex married couples living together, 5 (5.6%) had a female householder with no husband present, 9 (10.0%) had a male householder with no wife present.  There were 12 (13.3%) unmarried opposite-sex partnerships, and 1 (1.1%) same-sex married couples or partnerships. 43 households (47.8%) were made up of individuals, and 10 (11.1%) had someone living alone who was 65 years of age or older. The average household size was 1.88.  There were 35 families (38.9% of all households); the average family size was 2.43.

The population age was spread out, with 25 people (13.5%) under the age of 18, 12 people (6.5%) aged 18 to 24, 31 people (16.8%) aged 25 to 44, 86 people (46.5%) aged 45 to 64, and 31 people (16.8%) who were 65 years of age or older.  The median age was 51.7 years. For every 100 females, there were 160.6 males.  For every 100 females age 18 and over, there were 138.8 males.

The homeowner vacancy rate was 0%; the rental vacancy rate was 2.8%.  110 people (59.5% of the population) lived in owner-occupied housing units and 59 people (31.9%) lived in rental housing units.

Politics

Notable townspeople
Alice Fong Yu

References

 Slater, Robert I. and Grace I. Slater, "Historical Notes Of The Early Washington, Nevada County, California Mining District."

External links

Census-designated places in Nevada County, California
Populated places established in 1849
Census-designated places in California
1849 establishments in California